The Capitanes de Ciudad de México (English: Mexico City Captains) are a Mexican professional basketball team based in Mexico City, Mexico. The Capitanes competed as a member club in the Liga Nacional de Baloncesto Profesional (LNBP) for the first three seasons and the franchise is currently a member of the NBA G League. The team plays their home games in the Mexico City Arena in Mexico City.

The Capitanes were established before the 2017–18 season after the Mexican capital had been without a basketball team for a decade. The team was announced in October 2016.

In December 2019, the National Basketball Association's commissioner Adam Silver announced that the Capitanes will be joining the league's developmental league, the NBA G League, for at least five seasons beginning in the 2020–21 season. However, following the effects of the COVID-19 pandemic, no mention was made of the Capitanes participating in the league's 2021 bubble season and the team announced it would join in 2021–22.

History

Foundation 
The Mexican capital had lacked a competitive basketball team for a decade. In an attempt of reanimating the passion for basketball in Mexico City, a group of investors led by Moisés Cosío, announced the foundation of this new franchise. The group of investors accepted that the situation was challenging but Jordi Funtanet, the director of marketing and communications for the new team, stated: "It means a challenge and a very big opportunity, a challenge because as you say, it comes back and we have to assure the fans that we will be here for them (...) we are a team that can place their trust where they can deposit their passion for the basketball." It would be the first Liga Nacional de Baloncesto Profesional (LNBP) team not economically linked to the government and with totally private investment.

The players that were aimed to be brought into this new franchise were to be a solid base from the national team, and more experienced players from abroad.

The first season 

The management stated that the team's goal for the season was to qualify for the playoffs with an aim of the semifinal. The head coach for the season, was to be the Spaniard Ramón Díaz, who had been previously involved with the National Team, as an assistant coach. The state of the Gimnasium was improved, including dressing rooms, and the playing surface.

Their first preseason game ended in defeat against an amateur side. Their first official game was played on October 13, and ended in a 90–87 win for the Capitanes, against the Aguacateros de Michoacán. Their first season went extraordinarily, specially considering they were a new team. The Capitanes amassed a total of 21 wins in their first 30 matches, powered by an outstanding offense commanded by Pedro Meza, Fernando Bénitez, and Emmanuel Ándujar, who all received call ups to the All Star game in early December, along with head coach Ramón Díaz.

NBA G League
In December 2019, commissioner Adam Silver of the National Basketball Association (NBA) announced Capitanes were joining the NBA G League. The initial plan was starting from the 2020–21 season, the team would play in the G League for five seasons and be the first team outside the United States and Canada. However, due the restrictions in place during the COVID-19 pandemic, the season was postponed and eventually played at a single site in Orlando, Florida, for an abbreviated 2021 season without the Capitanes. The team announced it still plans to join the G League in 2021–22. On May 7, 2021, Nick Lagios was named the team's general manager. Due to the ongoing travel restrictions during the pandemic, the Capitanes were only scheduled to play 12 games in the 2021 G League Showcase Cup with all games in the United States. The team is based in Fort Worth, Texas, for the season so players do not have to cross the border during the restrictions.

On November 5, 2021, the Capitanes defeated the Memphis Hustle 95–90 in their first official G League game. During their inaugural G League season, the Capitanes had three of their players get called up to NBA teams: Gary Clark to the New Orleans Pelicans, Alfonzo McKinnie to the Chicago Bulls, and Matt Mooney to the New York Knicks. However, the Capitanes finished their shortened season with a 4–8 record, thus failing to qualify for the Showcase Cup tournament.

Logo and uniforms 

The Capitanes colors consist of blue, white, and yellow. The home uniforms consist of a blue jersey with an embroidered yellow outline and yellow lines in the sides along with blue shorts with yellow lines in the bottoms. The away uniforms consist of a white jersey with an embroidered blue outline and blue lines in the sides along with white shorts with blue lines in the bottoms. The alternate color is yellow, with blue  embroidered in the neck, sides and bottoms.

The team's logo consists of a yellow and blue rendering of the Monumento a la Revolución, a landmark of Mexico City, with the word Capitanes, underneath it, and Ciudad de México, in a smaller typography.

Home arena 

The Gimnasio Olímpico Juan de la Barrera was the home arena for the team between 2017 and 2020. Located in Mexico City, the venue hosted volleyball at the 1968 Summer Olympics. 

On August 16, 2022, The team announced that the Mexico City Arena would host the team's home games for the NBA G League's 2022–23 season and onwards. Although the arena has a full capacity for 22,300 spectators, the team announced the arena will seat a maximum of 8,000 people for Capitanes games.

Season by season 
The following is an overview of all seasons of Capitanes, including performance in national playoffs and international competitions:

Current roster

In international competitions
 Champions   Runners-up   Third place   Fourth place

References

External links 

 Official website

 
Basketball teams in Mexico
Basketball teams established in 2016
Sports teams in Mexico City
2016 establishments in Mexico
NBA G League teams